Alchemilla arvensis (syn. Aphanes arvensis), known as parsley-piert, is a sprawling, downy plant common all over the British Isles where It grows on arable fields and bare wastelands, particularly in dry sites. The short-stalked leaves have three segments each lobed at the tip. Flowers April–September. The tiny green flower has four sepals and no petals, the fruit is oval pointed. Stipules form a leaf-like cup, enclosing the flower. The name of parsley piert has nothing to do with parsley. It is a corruption of the French perce-pierre, meaning 'stone-piercer' and was given to the plant because of its habit of growing in shallow, stony soil and emerging between stones. As in the case of saxifrage (from the Latin meaning 'stone-breaker') it was wrongly assumed that the plant could pierce stones; and it was thought that a medicine made of parsley piert would break up stones in the bladder and kidneys. Old folk-names for the plant include 'colicwort' and 'bowel-hive-grass' (hive meant inflammation), showing that it was also used for intestinal ailments.

The 17th-century herbalist Nicholas Culpeper, recommended parsley piert for use in salads, although it would be difficult to gather sufficient quantities of such a tiny plant for a reasonable meal. Culpeper also recommends the plant to gentlemen for eating as a winter pickle in addition to the pickled samphire to which they were accustomed.

The previous genus name of Aphanes comes from a Greek word meaning "unseen" or "unnoticed", which precisely describes this tiny plant. Nevertheless, parsley piert is a very common and widespread weed of cultivated ground, whether acidic or not.

Description
Alchemilla arvensis is 2–20 cm high, leaves fan -shaped, short-stalked, with 3 deep-toothed main lobes; leaves only 2–10 mm long. Flowers minute, less than 2 mm, in dense clusters in leraf-axils, surrounded by cups formed by leaf-stipules; 4 sepals, epicalyx, but no petals; stamens usually one. Flowers April–October.

Habitat
On arable land, bare ground, on paths, on dry or chalky soils.

Distribution
Most of Europe, including Britain, east to Iran.

Gallery

References

External links

arvensis
Flora of Asia
Flora of Europe
Medicinal plants
Demulcents